William Lockhart may refer to:

 William Lockhart of Lee (1621–1675), Oliver Cromwell's ambassador at Paris
 William Lockhart (surgeon) (1811–1896), medical missionary and fellow of the Royal College of Surgeons
 William Lockhart (priest) (1820–1892), English Roman Catholic priest, convert from Anglicanism
 Sir William Lockhart (Indian Army officer) (1841–1900), British Indian Army general
 William Ewart Lockhart (1846–1900), Scottish Victorian painter
 William Mustart Lockhart (1855–1941), Scottish topographical painter
 William Thomas Lockhart (born 1839), Ontario merchant and political figure
 William Lockhart (MP) (1787–1856), British Member of Parliament for Lanarkshire